Marangu Magharibi is a town and ward in the Moshi Rural district of the Kilimanjaro Region of Tanzania. In 2016 the Tanzania National Bureau of Statistics report there were 20,352 people in the ward, from 18,976 in 2012.

References

Wards of Kilimanjaro Region